Unione Sportiva Milanese was an Italian association football club from Milan founded on 16 January 1902. Nicknamed Gli Scacchi ("The Checkerboards") for their jersey, the club was runners-up in the 1908 and 1909 Italian football championships. In 1928, the Fascist government forced the club to merge with Internazionale which was renamed S.S. Ambrosiana.

References 

Association football clubs established in 1902
Association football clubs disestablished in 1928
Football clubs in Milan
1902 establishments in Italy
Defunct football clubs in Italy
1928 disestablishments in Italy